Dinendra Kumar Roy (26 August 1869 – 27 June 1943) was a Bengali novelist and editor.

Early life
Roy was born in 1869 in Meherpur, British India. His father name was Brajanath Roy. He passed entrance from Mahisadal Raj High School and entered in Krishnagar Government College. In 1893 Roy became employed under the District judge of Rajshahi. He was appointed as Bengali language tutor of Sri Aurobindo as per recommendation of Rabindranath Tagore and stayed 2 years with Aurobindo in Baroda.

Literary career

Roy's first article was published in Bharati and Balok magazine. He became the sub editor of Saptahik Basumati magazine in 1900 at the same time edited Nandan Kanan monthly magazine. He became popular for Rahasya Lahari and Nandan Kanon detective series. Roy's created Robert Blake (Detective) series was based on Sexton Blake detective stories. In between 1898 and 1914 total 217 detective fictions of Robert Blake were published in Bengali. His books on villagers' lives and Hindu religious festivals in the villages of Bengal was admired by Tagore. Roy's other Books are:

 Basanti
 Palli Baichitra
 Palli Chitra
 Hamida
 Pat
 Ajay Singher Kuthi
 Pallikatha
 Palli Charitra
 Dhenkir Kirti

References

1869 births
1943 deaths
20th-century Bengalis
19th-century Bengalis
Bengali Hindus
Bengali novelists
Indian male writers
Indian writers
Indian novelists
Indian male novelists
Bengali writers
Bengali-language writers
Indian children's writers
Bengali detective fiction writers
University of Calcutta alumni
Indian editors
Indian magazine editors
20th-century Indian writers
20th-century Indian novelists
20th-century Indian male writers
19th-century Indian writers
19th-century Indian male writers
19th-century Indian novelists
Krishnagar Government College alumni
Writers from West Bengal
Indian crime fiction writers
Indian mystery writers
Indian thriller writers